China Creek is a stream in the U.S. state of Washington. It is a tributary of the Columbia River.

China Creek was named for the Chinese prospectors who operated in the area.

See also
List of rivers of Washington

References

Rivers of Stevens County, Washington
Rivers of Washington (state)